Bach is a municipality in the district of Regensburg in Bavaria in Germany. It lies on the Danube river.

References

Regensburg (district)
Populated places on the Danube